Paddy Mackey may refer to:

 Paddy Mackey (dual player) (1889–1948), Wexford hurler and Gaelic football player
 Paddy Mackey (Limerick hurler) (1920–1941)